Battle of Samdhara was the first battle fought between Mughals and the Ahoms in 1616

Background 
The first direct clash of arms between the Ahoms and Mughals was occasioned by an illegal trade-affair carried by a merchant, Ranta or Ratan Shah by name, who was procuring aloes-wood for Jahangir, at Singri, that lay to the east of the Barnadi and within the Ahom kingdom. On detection, his goods were confiscated and he was expelled from the Ahom territory. Shortly afterwards, unauthorised merchants of Bengal were found of the north of Kajali buying pulses, mustard seeds and other commodities. Two such mechant vessels were seized by the Ahom government and two of the tradesmen killed The incident of killing to the merchants was only a pretext to launch an invasion to Assam, the Mughal viceroy had long preparing for an invasion.

Expedition  
This stern action of the Ahom government was taken exception to by the Mughal government in Bengal , which was further dissatisfied with the Ahom king Pratap Singha for sheltering Balinarayan, brother of Parikshit. Seikh Qasim Khan, the governor of Bengal, sent immediately a force consisting of an army, more than 10,000 strong troops, and 300 well-equipped war-boats, under Syed Hakkim and Syed Aba Bakr. Sattrajit, son of the zamindar of Bhusna near Dacca, who had earlier fought successfully against Parikshit and had been rewarded by his appointment as thanadar of Pandu and Guahati, also accompanied the expeditionary force. Beside, some noted officers of the central government like Raja Jagdeo, grandson of Raja Todar Mal, Jamal Khan Mankali accompanied Aba Bakr. The expeditionary force started from Bajrapur in Bengal in March 1616 and reached the mouth of the Kalang river in the midst of rains in May/June of that year. The Ahom fleet stationed at the Kajali Choucki attacked the invading force by suffered a defeat and retreated with the loss of some boats. Elated at this victory, Sattrajit entered Sala by way of the Kalang, killed a few men and looted a royal store. After three days, he crossed the Brahmaputra, moved westward and carried away three female dancers from the Siva temple at Biswanath  in and sailed off

Battle 
The Ahoms had been watching carefully the movement of the Mughals and, in the meantime, strengthened the fort of Samdhara, which stood near the confluence of the Bharali  and the Brahmaputra. The Ahoms on the other side managed to gain valuable information about the Mughals from Ahkek Gohain, who previously went to the Mughal side, and was brought back to Ahom camp after being promised pardon. The Mughal also proceeded to the Bharali and stationed at its right bank, opposite of the Ahom fort at Samdhara.  At this, the Burhagohain, Boragohain and other officials asked for auspicious moment to attack, from the Deodhai's (astrologers), which they advised in a night attack (January 1616). The Mughals who were unprepared, were unable to face the enemy were easily overpowered. Large number of officers including Syed Hakim, Jamal Khan Kankali, Bhaaaban Roxi, Gokul chand, Lakshmi Rajput, Abu Bakr and his son were slain.

The imperial fleet of Mughals at first resisted, but couldn't after the fall of their commander Abu Bakr, and gave up further resistance. Almost whole of the Mughal fleet was captured by the Ahoms and some naval officers including Miran Sayed Masud, in-charge of the  war boats were slain. Sattrajit with Sona Ghazi made a narrow escape with two boats, while Ilahdad Khan Dakhini, Raja Rai, Narsing Rai, Karamchand, son of Satrajit and many others were captured. The casualties on the Mughal side, is estimated to around 1,700 men killed on the spot and, in total 5,000 killed,  about 9,000 men taken as captive, and about 3,000 men seeking safety in the jungles  by the author of Baharistan-i-Ghaibi. On the Ahom side Srifal Bora, Namal Bora, Hati Barua, Lacham Sandikoi and Chingdang were killed, but still gained a rich booty of elephant, horses and war materials. Pratap Singha having herd of the victory at Samdhara, ordered not to kill the captive officers, as he was anxious to see them in person. He rushed to Samdhara, but until then most of the Mughal officers were slain. At this he ordered the Ahom officers put to death, responsible for killing the captive Mughal officers. Pratap Singha later made a Mundamala (Garland of heads) with the heads of the deceased Mughals.

Aftermath 
Thus the maiden attempt Mughals to expand towards the east was successfully thwarted by the Ahoms. This defeat brought both ignominy and disaster to the Mughals.Qasim Khan was replaced by Ibrahim Khan Fathjang as the governor of Bengal in April 1617 and Lakshmi Narayan, who has been placed in detention for three years, was re-installed in his kingdom on the condition that he would serve the cause of the Mughals in their fight against the Ahoms. On the Ahom side, this victory greatly increased their prestige and solidified their position as the master-power of north-east. It was at this time that, they brought under their control the entire tract between the Barnadi and the Bharali. Pratap Singha, the Ahom king established Balinarayan  as the tributary raja of Darrang and renamed him as Dharmanarayan. Many of the captured soldiers and commanders were sacrificed to goddess Kamakhya in Kamakhya Temple, including the captured son of Sattrajit.

See also
 Ahom Dynasty
 Ahom kingdom
 Ahom–Mughal conflicts
 Battle of Saraighat

Notes

References 

 Baruah, S L (1986), A Comprehensive History of Assam, Munshiram Manoharlal
 Barua, Golap Chandra, Ahom-Buranji from the Earliest Time to the End of Ahom Rule
 Bhuyan, Suryya Kumar, Kamrupar Buranji

History of Assam
History of Guwahati
17th-century conflicts
17th century in the Ahom kingdom
Wars involving the Mughal Empire
17th century in the Mughal Empire
Ahom kingdom
Military history of India